Lorenzo L. Post was a member of the Wisconsin State Assembly.

Biography
Post was born on January 3, 1821, in Thetford, Vermont. After residing in the Town of Shullsburg in Lafayette County, Wisconsin, he moved to the Town of Weyauwega in Waupaca County, Wisconsin in 1851.

Career
Post was a member of the Assembly in 1878 and 1879. Other positions he held include Chairman of the county board of supervisors of Waupaca County, Wisconsin. He was a Democrat.

References

People from Thetford, Vermont
People from Shullsburg, Wisconsin
People from Weyauwega, Wisconsin
Democratic Party members of the Wisconsin State Assembly
County supervisors in Wisconsin
1821 births
Year of death missing